The table tennis competition at the 1991 European Youth Olympic Days was held from 18 to 20 July. The events took place in Brussels, Belgium. Girls and boys  born 1976 or 1977 or later participated in the event. The competition consisted of ingles competition and a mixed team event.

Medal summary

Men

References

1991 in table tennis
Table tennis at multi-sport events
Sport in Belgium
Sport in Brussels
1991 European Youth Olympic Days